Filipinos in Greece consist of migrants from the Philippines to Greece and their descendants. According to official Greek statistics, there were 5,826 Filipinos in Greece in 1991, which declined to 2,000 by 1996. In reality, there were many more working in the country illegally. The Philippine community have set up a school for their children in downtown Athens.

A large proportion are women (81% ), who generally find employment as domestic workers. The association between Filipinas and domestic work is so strong that a Greek dictionary published in 1998 even defined "Filippineza", a term which literally means Filipina, to be "a domestic worker from the Philippines or a person who performs non-essential auxiliary tasks". Migrants and the Philippine Department of Foreign Affairs protested to the Greek government about the dictionary.

History

Culture

See also
Greek settlement in the Philippines
Philippines–Greece relations

Notes

Sources
. A study of Albanian, Egyptian, and Filipino migrants.

Further reading

Ethnic groups in Greece
Greece